Guz Bilva Hajji Nasrallah (also Romanized as Gūz̤ Bīlvā Ḩājjī Naṣrāllah) is a village in Pian Rural District, in the Central District of Izeh County, Khuzestan Province, Iran. At the 2006 census, its population was 29, in 6 families.

References 

Populated places in Izeh County